Middleton Creek is a stream in the U.S. state of Tennessee.

Middleton Creek has the name of John Middleton, a pioneer settler. A variant name was "Middletons Creek".

References

Rivers of Chester County, Tennessee
Rivers of Hardin County, Tennessee
Rivers of Henderson County, Tennessee
Rivers of Tennessee